Acid Mothers Temple & the Melting Paraiso U.F.O is an album by the artists of the same name, released in 1997 by P.S.F. Records.

The album was recorded at Acid Mothers Temple from 1995 to 1997.

Track listing
 "Acid Mothers Prayer" 
 "Speed Guru"
 "From The Melting Paraiso U.F.O. I"
 "The Top Head Pixies"
 "Zen Feedbacker"
 "Coloradoughnut"
 "From The Melting Paraiso U.F.O. II"
 "Amphetamine A Go Go"
 "Pink Lady Lemonade"
 "Satori LSD"
 "Hawaiian Brownie"
 "Acid Mothers Temple For All!"

The songs on the CD are not indexed as individual tracks, i.e. they are all parts of one 52:59 long track.

Personnel
 Cotton Casino – voice, sitar, synthesizer
 Suhara Keizo – bass
 Koizumi Hajime – drums, percussion, soprano saxophone, monk
 Kawabata Makoto – guitars, synthesizers, sarangi, alto recorder, oriental clarinet, cosmic ring modulator, speed guru, producer, engineer, artwork

Additional personnel
 Higashi Hiroshi – guitar, synthesizer, effects, fishing rod
 Takahashi Atsuki – drums, penguin
 Suzuki Chisen – voice
 Mano Kazuhiko – tenner saxophone, bass clarinet, percussion
 Sakakibara Daiji – didgeridoo, earth spirit
 Yasuda Hisashi: – piano, magic cane
 Johan Wellens: – cosmic narration, freak power
 Yoko: – violin, cheese cake
 Ichi: – dog
 Jijiji: – synthesizer

References

Acid Mothers Temple albums
1997 albums